New Aspects of Politics is a 1925 book by Charles Merriam. It is considered to be one of the early contributions to the behaviouralist movement in politics.

References

External links
 

1925 non-fiction books
Comparative politics